Peter Schilperoort (1919 – 1990), also known as Pat Bronx, was a Dutch musician, famous for his work with the Dutch Swing College Band, and projects with other well-known musicians. He is most recognised as a saxophone and clarinet player, but also played the guitar and the banjo. Leading the Dutch Swing College Band from 1946 to 1955, then from 1960 to 1990, his style was Dixieland, a style popular at the start of the twentieth century. His band became widely popular across Europe, Australia, Asia and South America in 1960, known as a Dixieland revival band.

References

External links
 Peter Schilperoort at discogs.com
 Lex Lammen, Schilperoort, Anne Peter (1919-1990), in: Biografisch Woordenboek van Nederland.
 Biografie at kunstbus.nl 

1919 births
1990 deaths
Dixieland bandleaders
Dixieland revivalist clarinetists
Dutch clarinetists
Dutch jazz saxophonists
Male saxophonists
Musicians from The Hague
20th-century saxophonists
20th-century Dutch male musicians
Male jazz musicians
Dutch Swing College Band members